Udea khorassanalis is a moth in the family Crambidae. It is found in Iran.

References

Moths described in 1950
khorassanalis